Ethel Lynne (born Ethel Lindsay; February 25, 1897 – July 31, 1976) was an American actress who was active during Hollywood's silent era. She was married to director Fred Fishback, an associate of Fatty Arbuckle.

Biography 
Lynne was born in Fort Worth, Texas, to Frank Lindsay and Mary Elizabeth Chiles. She began acting as a teenager around 1915, appearing in a number of Al Christie comedies. She met and married director Fred Fishback in 1919. After Fishback's untimely death, she married a fellow Texan, Thomas Palmer; that marriage ended in divorce. Little is known of her life after the 1920s. She died on July 31, 1976.

Selected filmography 
 Some Chaperone (1915)
 Love and a Savage (1915)
 Wanted: A Leading Lady (1915)
 His Wedding Night (1916)
 By the Sad Sea Waves (1916)
 Jed's Trip to the Fair (1916)
 Help! Help! Police! (1917)
 Sauce for the Goose (1917)
 Bride and Gloom (1917)
 The Biggest Show on Earth (1918)
 Ever Since Eve (1921)

References 

1897 births
1976 deaths
American film actresses
American silent film actresses
20th-century American actresses
Actresses from Fort Worth, Texas